Jaipur (foaled 1959 in Kentucky) was an American Thoroughbred racehorse who won the 1962 Belmont Stakes and was voted that year's U.S. Eclipse Award for Outstanding 3-Year-Old Male Horse.

Jaipur was a  son of Nasrullah out of the mare Rare Perfume, whose sire was Eight Thirty.  He was bred by George D. Widener, Jr.'s Erdenheim Farm.

As a yearling, Jaipur was broken and exercised by soon-to-be jockey Michael Tornambe, who was the first person to ride the colt. He was also under the care of farm manager Ralph Delaney.

Trained by future U.S. Racing Hall of Fame inductee Bert Mulholland, Jaipur won ten of his nineteen races, including the 1962 Belmont, Withers, and Travers Stakes while ridden by Willie Shoemaker.

One of American Horse Racing's Top 100 Moments 
In the 1962 Travers Stakes at Saratoga Race Course, Jaipur won by a fraction of a nose in track-record time over Ridan.  Still written and talked about today, the race is listed in the 2006 book Horse Racing's Top 100 Moments written by the staff of Blood-Horse Publications.  The race result determined which colt was named the 1962 U.S. Champion 3-Year-Old Horse. He died in 1987.

References 
 Jaipur's pedigree and racing stats

1959 racehorse births
1987 racehorse deaths
Racehorses bred in Kentucky
Racehorses trained in the United States
Belmont Stakes winners
Widener family
Thoroughbred family 8-c